Culbone Church, located in the village of Culbone in Somerset, is said to be the smallest parish church in England. The church, dedicated to the Welsh saint Beuno, has been designated by English Heritage as a Grade I listed building and the churchyard cross is Grade II*.

The church is recorded in the Domesday Book.

Services are still held there, despite the lack of access by road. The church is probably pre-Norman in origin, with a 13th-century porch and a late-15th-century nave. It was refenestrated and re-roofed around 1810 and the spirelet added in 1888. It underwent further restoration in 1928.

Joan D'Arcy Cooper, psychologist, Yoga teacher, author of Guided Meditation and the Teaching of Jesus, and wife of the potter Waistel Cooper, was organist at the church and is buried in the graveyard. The graveyard also contains a war grave of a soldier of the Welsh Guards of World War II. Sir David Calcutt QC, a barrister and public servant, is buried in the churchyard too.

Interior and exterior features
The nave has retained its box pews, including a Jacobean squire's pew for the now ruined Ashley Combe House. The tall proportion of the nave and the primitive bowl font suggests Anglo-Saxon origins. The east end is restored. There is a small window, carved from a single block of sandstone, outside the north wall of the chancel, with a face on top of the pillar dividing the two window lights. This is probably also Saxon.

Access
The church is passed by the South West Coast Path, but drivers must turn off the A39 opposite the village pub, and park where possible on the narrow track. There is then a walk of  "through steep woods of walnut and oak, glorious on a summer's day with the sea glinting through the trees, darkly mysterious and dripping with water in winter".

In media
In a television version of Lorna Doone, St Beuno's was used as the location for the marriage of John Ridd at Oare Church.

The church is featured briefly in the video for Mike and the Mechanics' 1988 hit song "The Living Years".

A 2016 BBC television series Coastal Path, about the South West Coast Path, includes a visit to the church.

See also
 List of Grade I listed buildings in West Somerset
 List of ecclesiastical parishes in the Diocese of Bath and Wells

References

External links 
 Culbone Church website
 Culbone Church, Porlock at minehead-online.co

Churches in Somerset
Grade I listed churches in Somerset
Grade I listed buildings in West Somerset
Grade II* listed buildings in West Somerset